Julien Soyer (born 4 March 1978) is a former para table tennis player from India who competed for France in international level events. He contracted polio aged six months old and had his right leg amputated; he would wear a complete prosthetic when competing in table tennis events. After his retirement from sport, he works as a sports journalist.

References

1978 births
Living people
Indian emigrants to France
French male journalists
French sports journalists
Paralympic table tennis players of France
Table tennis players at the 2000 Summer Paralympics
Table tennis players at the 2004 Summer Paralympics
Medalists at the 2000 Summer Paralympics
Medalists at the 2004 Summer Paralympics
Paralympic silver medalists for France
Paralympic medalists in table tennis
French male table tennis players